Thomas Hynxstend (by 1516 – 1545?), of Winchelsea, Sussex, was an English politician.

He was a Member of Parliament (MP) for Winchelsea in 1545.

References

1545 deaths
English MPs 1545–1547
Year of birth uncertain